The Nicholas Street Historic District is a historic district in downtown Omaha, Nebraska. It is roughly bounded by 11th Street on the east, 14th Street to the west, and centered around Nicholas Street.

History
The Nicholas Street Historic District was a swarm of brick industrial buildings. It was founded near 1890 as a place to collect goods and ship them over the Missouri River. It was also originally a spot for residential purposes. It retained this motive in the central part of the district, but was cleared out in the south part when industrialization took over.

The district was surrounded on three sides by railroad tracks laid by Union Pacific. Its proximity to Union Pacific Railroads, being only a mile away, made it a prime spot for industrialization.

After the Great Depression, the area saw little change, and shrunk soon after. There are still businesses to this day, but the area had little space for expansion, and the appeal of the area was low. Much of the area in the district was picked up by the city of Omaha. Additionally, being surrounded on three sides by railroads, the area was hard to access and limited the number of people and businesses in the district.

In 2009, it was inducted into the National Register of Historic Places

References

External links

Historic districts in Omaha, Nebraska
National Register of Historic Places in Omaha, Nebraska